El Qutlugh Khatun was the daughter of Abaqa Khan (r. 1265–82), the second Mongol ruler of the Ilkhanate. Her story, included in Khalīl ibn Aybeg al-Ṣafadī's (around 1297-1363) bibliographic dictionary, sheds light on changing gender norms during the widespread conversion in the Ilkhanate to Islam. Her story also depicts the status of women during the period.

The Hajj
It is unclear how many women went on the Hajj during the pre-modern era. According to al-Ṣafadī', however, El Qutlugh was one of the women who did make the journey. Her travels were done on horseback (not in a palanquin fastened to a camel) with a quiver of arrows at her waist. There were differences in her journey in comparison to the wives of senior Mamluk officials from the same period. Her hajj trip happened in 1323.

Family 
She was married to Ghurbatai Güregen from the Hushin tribe. Her husband was active during Arghun and Gaykhatu's reign, supported the latter during Baydu's revolt. He also had two children named Beglemish and Bitigchi, although it is not known if El Qutlugh was their mother. Ghurbatai was murdered some time after Gaykhatu's reign and El Qutlugh was known to avenge him, however exact dating is not known.

Ghazan's death 
Mamluk sources credit her with inciting Bulughan Khatun to poison Ghazan Khan.

Notes

People of the Ilkhanate
Women of the Mongol Empire
Borjigin